The Sinai Health is a hospital system which serves Toronto, Ontario, Canada. It comprises two hospitals, Mount Sinai Hospital (an acute care hospital) and Hennick Bridgepoint Hospital, formally Bridgepoint Active Healthcare (a rehabilitation hospital), both affiliated with the University of Toronto Faculty of Medicine.

In the 2019-2020 fiscal year, there were nearly 29,000 inpatient stays and 59,700 emergency department visits for Mount Sinai Hospital. The average length of stay for inpatients was 4.4 days.

Formation
The hospital system was formed through the voluntary amalgamation of Mount Sinai Hospital (including the Lunenfeld-Tanenbaum Research Institute) and Hennick Bridgepoint Hospital on January 22, 2015.

Constituent hospitals

Mount Sinai Hospital

Mount Sinai Hospital (founded 1923 as The Hebrew Maternity and Convalescent Hospital) is a 442-bed general hospital located along the "Hospital Row" portion of University Avenue in downtown Toronto. It is connected via tunnels and bridges to three adjacent hospitals of the University Health Network: Toronto General Hospital, Toronto Rehabilitation Institute, and Princess Margaret Cancer Centre.

Lunenfeld-Tanenbaum Research Institute

The Lunenfeld-Tanenbaum Research Institute (founded 1985 as the Samuel Lunenfeld Research Institute) is the medical research institute of Mount Sinai Hospital. Its researchers conduct studies into various diseases including cancers, neurological disorders, and diabetes.

Hennick Bridgepoint Hospital

Hennick Bridgepoint Hospital (founded 1875 as Riverdale Isolation Hospital) is a 464-bed rehabilitation hospital located in the Riverdale neighbourhood of Toronto. It operates programs for patients with complex chronic ailments or those requiring physical rehabilitation.

Programs 
Sinai Health and University Health Network jointly run the Sinai Health-UHN Antimicrobial Stewardship Program, advocating for improved patient access to appropriate antibiotics while combating antimicrobial resistance. The program is led by infectious diseases specialist Andrew Morris, who joined as founding Director at its inception in 2009.

References

External links
 

Hospital networks in Canada

2015 establishments in Ontario